Charles Jarvis may refer to:
Charles Jervas (1675–1739), sometimes known as Charles Jarvis, Irish portrait painter
Charles Jarvis (cricketer) (1792–1855), English cricketer
Charles William Jarvis (1866–1932), Canadian banker and politician
Charles Jarvis (VC) (1881–1948), Scottish recipient of the Victoria Cross
Charles Jarvis (businessman), American businessman and politician